Paul Gallagher may refer to:

 Paul Gallagher (barrister) (born 1955), Attorney General of Ireland, 2007–2011
 Paul Gallagher (bishop) (born 1954), diplomat of the Holy See
 Paul Gallagher (footballer) (born 1984), Scottish football player for Preston North End
 Paul Gallagher (trade unionist) (born 1944), English trade union leader

See also 
 Paul Gallacher (born 1979), Scottish football goalkeeper (Dundee United, Norwich City, Dunfermline Athletic, St. Mirren, Partick Thistle, Scotland)